Office 1 International Inc. (Office 1) is an International franchise company established in Florida, USA and currently present in 3 countries – Bulgaria, France and Greece. On February 20, 2018, Panda Cooperation officially acquired all the trademark rights of the Office 1 Superstore portfolio. From a major franchisee in Bulgaria, Panda Cooperation becomes the sole owner and representative of Office 1, Office 1 Superstore, Office 1 Superstore International and Office 1 e-shop brands worldwide.

Office 1 Bulgaria 
In 1998 the chain entered the Bulgarian market, when Panda Cooperation received a master franchise for the territory of Bulgaria. The first Bulgarian Office 1 Superstore has been opened in June 1998 in Sofia. Gradually, the successful management and good performance of the Bulgarian unit cause Office 1 Superstore Bulgaria to play an increasingly crucial role in the management and development of the international chain.

Nowadays Office 1 Superstore is the largest chain of stores for office supplies in Bulgaria with an extensive network of sub-franchisees and own stores. For 23 years the company has been the undisputed market leader and a preferred partner of more than 130 000 business clients.

References
Bulgaria's Panda Cooperation acquires Office 1 Superstore's global brands

Franchises
American companies established in 1989
Retail companies established in 1989
Office supply retailers of the United States
Wholesalers of the United States
Retail companies of Bulgaria
Companies based in Palm Beach County, Florida